The Filson Historical Society, founded in 1884, is a privately supported historical society located at 1310 South 3rd Street in Louisville, Kentucky. The Filson is an organization dedicated to providing continuing adult education in the form of quarterly peer-reviewed academic journal, Ohio Valley History, a quarterly magazine, The Filson, weekly lectures, historical tours, and exhibits.

The Filson's mission is to collect, preserve, and tell the stories of Kentucky and Ohio Valley history and culture. In 2017, the Filson began a new initiative to document, preserve, and study the history of Jewish life and experience in Louisville and the Ohio Valley region, establishing the Jewish Community Archive. The Filson hosts programs and exhibitions that engage critically and honestly with the past with topics such as: Commemorating Juneteenth, David Blight's talk on Frederick Douglas, Christina Snyder's discussion of Great Crossings: Indians, Settlers, and Slaves in the Age of Jackson, Alaina Roberts I’ve Been Here All the While: Black Freedom on Native Land, and Dan Gediman's presentation on reckoning with slavery in Kentucky. In the summer of 2020, the Filson published a list of historical resources on racial inequality in Louisville and issued a community response to racism.

History

The Filson was founded on May 15, 1884, by ten men, primarily Louisvillians, with a common love of history. The primary founder and first president was Reuben T. Durrett.

The organization was named in honor of John Filson, Kentucky's first Anglophone historian, whose book, The Discovery, Settlement, and Present State of Kentucke, and map of Kentucky were published in 1784. In honor of Filson and the centennial of those historical publications the organization was christened The Filson Club. From that small gathering of amateur historians in Durrett's home, the institution evolved into Kentucky's premier privately supported historical society.

Today, thousands of people visit annually to conduct research, attend programs, and view the rotating exhibits on the Filson's campus in historic Old Louisville.

The Ferguson Mansion has been the Filson Historical Society's headquarters since 1986. Designed by the architectural firm of Dodd and Cobb and completed in 1905, the Ferguson mansion is one of the finest examples of Beaux Arts architecture in Louisville. Built for industrialist Edwin Hite Ferguson, it showcased his success and family's social status.

Sold to the Pearson family in the 1920s, the mansion was a funeral home for almost half a century. After passing through two other owners - including serving as the campaign headquarters for former Kentucky governor, John Y. Brown (b. 1933, governor of Kentucky 1979–1983) - the Filson purchased the mansion and accompanying carriage house in 1984. Renovation and a stacks addition for the collection were completed in spring 1986. Both beautiful and functional, the Ferguson has been a wonderful home for the Filson and, in turn, by owning this historic property the Filson is assuring its preservation.

The Filson opened its renovated campus and the newly constructed Owsley Brown II History Center at 1310 South 3rd Street in October 2016.

Locations 

Filson Club members met at founding president Reuben Durrett's home at 202 E. Chestnut at Brook Street in Louisville from 1884 to 1913. Here Durrett maintained his own extensive historical collection.  

During Durrett's final illness in 1913, arrangements were made for his collection to be sold to the University of Chicago, due to the lack of a fireproof vault for document storage in Louisville. Unfortunately, much of the Filson Club's collections were incorporated into Durrett's personal collection, meaning a portion of it left the state.

The Filson Club's collections that remained after the sale were transferred to the library of Filson vice president Rogers Clark Ballard Thruston, located in the Columbia Building at Fourth and Main Streets in Louisville, and were housed there until 1929. Thruston, and other Filson members, recognized the need for a stand-alone building. A drive for funds was successfully conducted in 1926, and a property was purchased, remodeled, and fireproofed.  

In June 1929, the Filson's materials, along with Mr. Thruston's personal collection which he gifted in full, were transferred to the club's new home at 118 West Breckinridge Street. Architect E. T. Hutchings renovated two townhouses into one Georgian-style building, housing the Filson's archives, library, museum, and offices.

Present Campus 

As time passed, the administration and board began to look for a new location that could accommodate a growing collection and staff, along with additional programming space. The purchase of the Edwin Hite Ferguson Mansion at 1310 South 3rd Street was finalized in 1984, the centennial of the Filson's existence, and then began the renovation and additions to the Filson's new home. Building renovations and the addition of 6 levels of temperature controlled/secure stacks were completed throughout 1985, and in summer 1986 the Filson's collections and staff moved into the new location, which encompassed the mansion for offices and library/archival storage, as well as a carriage house for Museum storage and display.  

The library, archival, and museum collections continued to grow, as did programming and staff, throughout the 1980s and 1990s; the Filson's name changed from “Club” to “Historical Society” as a focus on scholarly research on Ohio Valley history was introduced. Plans for expansion of the 3rd Street campus began in 2002 with the purchase of the Bank One building located at 4th and Ormsby, a 60,000 sq ft building with two parking lots. The Filson's major expansion began in the 2010s with renovations to the Ferguson Mansion and carriage house, and the construction of the Owsley Brown II History Center, creating space for exhibition galleries, expanded library and special collections reading rooms, programming and event rental venues.

Collections 

The Filson Historical Society's Collection includes approximately 2.1 million documents, photos, & prints, 50,000 books, 10,000 museum items, and 400 portraits. The Filson began collecting historical material soon after its founding in 1884, when few other Kentucky institutions were doing so. With many of its early members belonging to Kentucky's oldest and most prominent families, the Filson was able to begin assembling an important collection of original letters, diaries, business records, and other primary sources. Its holdings for the late eighteenth through mid-nineteenth centuries are unrivaled in Kentucky.

The collection focuses on Kentucky, the Ohio Valley, and the Upper South, but is national and even international in scope, with researchers from across the nation and abroad visiting each year. The Filson's unique holdings are essential primary sources for scholars of the Trans-Appalachian frontier; the Lewis & Clark Expedition; antebellum enslavement and emancipation; Southern Jewish history; regional architecture; Progressive-era urban reform; Suffrage and Women's Rights; regional theater, music and literature; river and rail transportation; and military history from the 18th to 20th centuries. In addition to manuscript and rare book holdings, the Filson holds an important museum collection of early Kentucky portraiture, Ohio Valley artists in a variety of media, and textiles and historical clothing.

The Filson's website has extensive collections listings with finding aids, a keyword-searchable database of manuscript collections, digital collections of photographs and museum objects, and a library catalog of rare books and pamphlets. Ohio Valley History regularly publishes collections essays by Filson archivists and curators that discuss new acquisitions, themes running across collections, and raising awareness of marginalized voices from within the collection.

Since 2001, the Filson has supported scholarly research in the collection with a fellowship program that has funded the work of over 250 scholars from institutions across the United States and the world.

Publications 

The Filson proudly produces two quarterly publications: Ohio Valley History and The Filson news magazine.

A collaboration of the Filson Historical Society, Cincinnati Museum Center, and the University of Cincinnati, Ohio Valley History is a quarterly journal of the history and culture of the Ohio Valley and the Upper South.

The Filson is a quarterly news magazine dedicated to giving members a better look at what is going on at the Filson Historical Society. With articles about recent acquisitions, staff research in the collections, and membership information, it continues to fulfill our mission to collect, preserve, and tell the stories of our region.

Published between 1926 and 2002, The Filson Club History Quarterly offered scholarly articles related to the history of Kentucky and the surrounding area as well as genealogy, news and comments geared toward the Filson membership.  Not only are the Quarterly articles fascinating to read but they are a rich published source for regional research.

Programs 

The Filson's programming hosts events such as the Gertrude Polk Brown lecture series, which regularly includes authors currently on national bestseller lists, such as David Blight, H. W. Brands, Liza Mundy, Fredrik Logevall, and Steve Inskeep; the Notable Louisville Neighborhoods series, a series designed to connect people with history in a meaningful way and to highlight resources available at the Filson; workshops and discussions led by Filson staff on how to archive and preserve your personal and family history, how to research your historic home, how to care for historic photographs, and more; a variety of concerts featuring regional artists; and authors, journalists, and historians discussing the history of the Ohio River valley.

Relationship to Oxmoor Farm 
The Filson Historical Society has a unique relationship with the Bullitt family and the historic Oxmoor Farm in eastern Jefferson County.   The original part of the Oxmoor mansion was built in 1791 and remained in the Bullitt family for six generations until the death of Thomas Walker Bullitt in 1991 and his widow, Katharine Stammers Bullitt, in 2005. The Filson Historical Society has no ownership interest in the mansion and grounds. The Oxmoor Preservation Committee was established under Thomas Walker Bullitt's will and is responsible for advising the Oxmoor trustee on the care and ongoing maintenance of the Oxmoor mansion and farm; the president and CEO of the Filson is a member of this committee, as are Bullitt family members.

Through Mr. Bullitt's estate, the Filson received generous support to develop and enhance programming and research in line with Mr. Bullitt's general interests in philanthropy, education, preservation, and Kentucky history.  A subsequent agreement with the Bullitt family provided the Filson with complete title to the important collection of Bullitt family papers, spanning over two centuries of life at Oxmoor, and generously endowed additional funding for scholarship, archiving, and programming expenses.  As an important component of the relationship with Oxmoor, the Filson conducts several annual programs and events at Oxmoor.  Oxmoor, and a surrounding parcel of land, are owned in trust and managed by a trustee, and are protected in perpetuity through a Commonwealth of Kentucky preservation easement administered by the Kentucky Heritage Council.

Founders 

 Reuben T. Durrett (1824-1913)  
 Richard H. Collins (1824-1888)  
 William Chenault (1835-1901)  
 John Mason Brown (1837-1890)  
 Basil W. Duke (1838-1916)  
 George M. Davie (1848-1900)  
 James Speed Pirtle (1840-1917)  
 Thomas W. Bullitt (1845-1921)  
 Alexander Pope Humphrey (1848-1928)  
 Thomas Speed (1841-1905)

See also
List of attractions and events in the Louisville metropolitan area
List of Museums in Kentucky
Old Louisville

References

Further reading
Lee, Jacob. “‘Whether it Really be Truth or Fiction’: Colonel Reuben T. Durrett, the Filson Club, and Historical Memory in Postbellum Kentucky.” Ohio Valley History 9, no. 4 (Winter 2009) 27-47.

External links
The Filson Historical Society website
Staff and board of the Filson Historical Society 
Ohio Valley History – Project MUSE 
The Filson News Magazine 
Filson Digital Exhibitions and Collections 
PastPerfect Online – digital images database 
Filson YouTube Channel 
Upcoming Filson events 
 

1884 establishments in Kentucky
History of Louisville, Kentucky
Tourist attractions in Louisville, Kentucky
History museums in Kentucky
Museums in Louisville, Kentucky
Historical societies in Kentucky
Organizations established in 1884
Local museums in the United States
National Register of Historic Places in Louisville, Kentucky
Georgian Revival architecture in Kentucky
Houses in Louisville, Kentucky
Houses on the National Register of Historic Places in Kentucky